The Trolley Museum of New York, a non-profit organization, is located at 89 East Strand Street, Kingston, New York.  The museum is open to the public on a seasonal schedule, but volunteer activities relating to the preservation of historic transit are year-round.

History
The museum was founded in 1955 in Brooklyn to save some of the last trolley cars still in New York City.  During the early years of the museum's existence, it had no permanent home.  The growing collection of trolley and subway cars were stored in various locations, such as Staten Island and northern New Jersey.  On a few occasions until the city took down the last of the overhead wire in the early 1960s, the museum operated a Swedish trolley car on McDonald Avenue, Brooklyn. The museum also held movie nights for members in a Peter Witt streetcar at St. George, Staten Island.

In 1983 the museum finally found a permanent home in Kingston, occupying the abandoned Rondout shops area, MP 1, of the Ulster and Delaware Railroad (U&D).  As a condition of the museum's charter with the city of Kingston, the museum had to immediately begin public operations.  At the time, everything in the museum collection was electric powered and the U&D tracks were not equipped for electric operation.  The museum acquired a Doodlebug (a former Sperry Rail Service car) from Connecticut and began public operation on July 4, 1983.  At first, less than a mile of track was usable, but within two years the run was extended to Kingston Point to provide scenic views of the Hudson River.  In 2000 the museum began operating a trolley from Johnstown, Pennsylvania after a nine-year restoration.

The museum leases the yard and about 1.5 miles of right of way and track from the City of Kingston.  This includes the former U&D main line from Kingston Point, MP 0, to about MP 1.1, plus a spur track that runs from the yard along Ferry Street to T. R. Gallo Park at Rondout Landing.  The Museum operates on a seasonal schedule on weekends and holidays.

Collection
Notable items in the collection:

 Brill No. 120. One of two former Sperry Rail Service Model 55 Brill cars, also ex. Remington Arms (the other was No. 121, now numbered M-55, at the Belvidere and Delaware River Railway).  Recently restored to operation.
 Brooklyn and Queens Transit Corporation No. 1000. The only PCC streetcar built by Clark Equipment; only PCC with aluminum body. Since September 2013, it has been on the New York State list of Historic Places.  
 Hamburg No. 3584. One of two V6E class Hamburg trams imported to the United States (the other is in San Francisco).
 Holmenkolbanen (Oslo, Norway) No. 3. Tram built in 1897, used by King Olav V of Norway.
 Johnstown Traction Company No. 358. Converted to diesel power in 1962, operating at TMNY since 2000.
 PATH PA-1 commuter No. 143. Survived the collapse of the World Trade Center on 9/11.
 Standard Lo-V (New York City Subway car) No. 5600.
 R4 (New York City Subway car) No. 825
 R16 (New York City Subway car) No. 6398. Restoration has been completed on this train.
 Whitcomb diesel electric locomotive No. 9. A rare operable example of the 65 ton class of military specification locomotives famous for their service during World War II in Europe.  It has been restored into operating condition.
 Q-type Queens car (New York City Subway car) No. 1602A (ex-BU 1410), awaiting restoration.
 R3 Drill Motor No. 41, generator to be installed for 600V power for this and additional cars.

The museum recently added a number of retired transit buses to the collection.

References

External links
 Trolley Museum of New York

Railroad museums in New York (state)
Heritage railroads in New York (state)
Museums in Ulster County, New York
Tourist attractions in Ulster County, New York
Hudson River
Kingston, New York
Museums established in 1955
Street railway museums in the United States
1955 establishments in New York (state)